Flavitalea populi is a Gram-negative, rod-shaped, aerobic and non-motile bacterium from the genus of Flavitalea which has been isolated from soil from the plant Populus euphratica from a forest in Xinjiang in China.

References

Chitinophagia
Bacteria described in 2011